Evarcha denticulata is a jumping spider species that lives in South Africa and was first identified in 2013.

References

Endemic fauna of South Africa
Salticidae
Spiders described in 2013
Spiders of South Africa